Cacophis is a genus of  venomous snakes, commonly known as crowned snakes, in the family Elapidae. The genus is endemic to Australia.

Description
All species of Cacophis have a distinct "crown" pattern on the head, which gives them their common names. They are venomous, but not dangerous to people.

Species
The following four species are recognized as being valid.
Cacophis churchilli  – northern dwarf crowned snake - ne Queensland
Cacophis harriettae  – white-crowned snake - e Queensland and ne NSW
Cacophis krefftii  – dwarf crowned snake - se Queensland and e NSW
Cacophis squamulosus  – golden-crowned snake - e Queensland, e NSW and ACT

Nota bene: In the above list, a binomial authority in parentheses indicate that the species was originally described in a genus other than Cacophis.

Distribution and habitat
Species of Cacophis are distributed along eastern Australia. They inhabit a variety of forest types, from woodland to rainforest.

Behaviour
Cacophis species are generally nocturnal and feed on lizards and reptile eggs.

References

Further reading
Cogger HG (2014). Reptiles and Amphibians of Australia, Seventh Edition. Clayton, Victoria, Australia: CSIRO Publishing. xxx + 1,033 pp. .
Günther A (1863). "Third Account of new Species of Snakes in the Collection of the British Museum". Ann. Mag. Nat. Hist., Third Series 12: 348-365 + Plates V & VI. (Cacophis, new genus, p. 361).
Swan, Gerry (1995). A Photographic Guide to Snakes and other Reptiles of Australia. Sydney: New Holland. 144 pp. .
Wilson, Steve; Swan, Gerry (2013). A Complete Guide to Reptiles of Australia, Fourth Edition. Sydney: New Holland Publishers. 522 pp. .

 
Snake genera
Taxa named by Albert Günther
Endemic fauna of Australia